Patrick Robinson (born October 3, 1969 in Memphis, Tennessee) was an American football player who played college football at Tennessee State and in the NFL for the Cincinnati Bengals and Arizona Cardinals.

1969 births
Living people
American football wide receivers
Cincinnati Bengals players
Arizona Cardinals players
Players of American football from Memphis, Tennessee
Tennessee State Tigers football players